Aloeides barklyi, the Barkly's copper, is a butterfly of the family Lycaenidae. It is found in South Africa, where it is found in the Northern Cape, south to the Western Cape, the Cederberg and the Name Karoo at Matjiesfontein.

The wingspan is 30–34 mm for males and 32–36 mm for females. Adults are on wing from August to October and from March to May. There are two generations per year.

References

Butterflies described in 1874
Aloeides
Endemic butterflies of South Africa
Taxa named by Roland Trimen